The following is a list of coaches who have coached the Richmond Football Club in a game of Australian rules football in the Australian Football League (AFL) (formerly the Victorian Football League (VFL)) and in the AFL Women's competition (AFLW).

AFL Women's

References
Richmond Coaches Win–loss records at AFL Tables

Richmond Football Club coaches

Richmond Football Club coaches